Hobson Street is the major street in Auckland, New Zealand. It lies on the western side of Queen Street. It is a commercial and high-rise residential street, and provides access to the Auckland Northern Motorway going south, and the Northwest Motorway going west. For most of its length it is one-way. One block to the west is Nelson Street, which is one-way in the other direction and provides access to the central city for traffic exiting from the motorways. One block to the east is Albert Street, part of Mayoral Drive, and Vincent Street. The area encompassed by these streets is called Hobson Ridge by Statistics New Zealand.

History
Hobson Street existed by 1842 but it was not initially entirely urban, with the Auckland City Council being asked to prevent cattle from obstructing its footpaths in 1870. The street was named after the first Governor of New Zealand, William Hobson.

By 1884, the street was an important route for horse-drawn trams travelling south to Ponsonby and Karangahape Road, as the steep southern portion of Queen Street was unsuitable for horses. By the early 20th century, Hobson Street had become a busy thoroughfare to reach the western suburbs of central Auckland, such as Ponsonby and Grey Lynn.

The Nelson Street-Hobson Street one-way system was in place in the early 1970s.

Demographics

The Hobson Street statistical areas had a population of 8,190 at the 2018 New Zealand census, an increase of 1,092 people (15.4%) since the 2013 census, and an increase of 3,657 people (80.7%) since the 2006 census. There were 3,540 households, comprising 4,422 males and 3,762 females, giving a sex ratio of 1.18 males per female, with 441 people (5.4%) aged under 15 years, 4,398 (53.7%) aged 15 to 29, 3,138 (38.3%) aged 30 to 64, and 213 (2.6%) aged 65 or older.

Ethnicities were 22.5% European/Pākehā, 3.2% Māori, 2.8% Pacific peoples, 67.2% Asian, and 8.7% other ethnicities. People may identify with more than one ethnicity.

The percentage of people born overseas was 81.1, compared with 27.1% nationally.

Although some people chose not to answer the census's question about religious affiliation, 40.7% had no religion, 25.4% were Christian, 0.2% had Māori religious beliefs, 17.7% were Hindu, 3.7% were Muslim, 4.0% were Buddhist and 4.6% had other religions.

Of those at least 15 years old, 3,348 (43.2%) people had a bachelor's or higher degree, and 378 (4.9%) people had no formal qualifications. 816 people (10.5%) earned over $70,000 compared to 17.2% nationally. The employment status of those at least 15 was that 3,852 (49.7%) people were employed full-time, 1,554 (20.1%) were part-time, and 423 (5.5%) were unemployed.

Notable locations

Auckland Harbour Board Workshops, corner Lower Hobson and Quay Street, 1944-1989, site spread between Lower Hobson St, Customs Street and Quay Street, repair of boats, cranes and other equipment.
Tepid Baths, corner Customs and Lower Hobson Streets, 1914, public indoor pool complex.
St Patrick's Presbytery, corner Wyndham and Hobson Streets, 1888, priest's residence and administrative centre of the Roman Catholic Diocese of Auckland. Part of the St Patrick's Cathedral site.
Farmers Building, 35 Hobson Street, 1914, Retail, office and warehouse for Farmers Trading Company 1914-1991.
St Matthew-in-the-City, 132-134 Hobson Street, 1905, neo-gothic Anglican church.
Higher Thought Temple, 1 Union Street, late 1920s, non-denominational church associated with the New Thought movement.
Wesleyan Chapel, 8A Pitt Street, 1860, oldest surviving brick church in New Zealand. Owned by the Independent Order of Odd Fellows for most of the 20th century.

References

Auckland CBD
Streets in Auckland